This is a list of units that are not defined as part of the International System of Units (SI) but are otherwise mentioned in the SI Brochure, listed as being accepted for use alongside SI-units, or for explanatory purposes.

Units officially accepted for use with the SI

The SI prefixes can be used with several of these units, but not, for example, with the non-SI units of time.

Other units defined but not officially sanctioned 
The following table lists units that are effectively defined in side- and footnotes in the 9th SI brochure.  Units that are mentioned without a definition or that occur in historical material recorded in the appendices are not included.

Changes to units mentioned in the SI 
With the publication of each edition of the SI brochure, the list of non-SI units listed in tables changed compared to the preceding SI brochures.  The table below compares the status of each unit for which the status has changed between editions of the SI Brochure.

In this table, the status descriptions have the following meanings:
 "accepted": The unit is accepted for use with the SI.
 "temporarily accepted": The unit is accepted for use with the SI, but is planned to be phased out.
 "listed": The unit is defined in a table of units in the brochure but not accepted for use with the SI.
 "footnote only": The unit is defined in a footnote or side note, without any mention in the main text.
 "not mentioned": There is no mention of the unit in the brochure, excluding historical appendices.

See also 
 International System of Quantities
 International vocabulary of metrology
 Metric prefix
 SI base unit
 SI derived unit

Notes and references

Notes

References